Bardzravan is a village in the Goris Municipality of the Syunik Province in Armenia.

Toponymy 
The village was previously known as Yeritsatumb.

Demographics

Population 
The Statistical Committee of Armenia reported its population as 175 in 2010, up from 168 at the 2001 census.

References 

Populated places in Syunik Province